Erbessa biplagiata is a moth of the family Notodontidae first described by William Warren in 1897. It is found in Bolivia and Peru.

References

Moths described in 1897
Notodontidae of South America